Eugene Cussons (born July 6, 1979) was the Managing Director of "Chimpanzee Eden" as well as Rescue Director of the Jane Goodall Institute (JGI) in South Africa. He is also the host of  Animal Planet's Escape to Chimp Eden, author of the book Saving Chimpanzees and is the Executive Director and Ambassador of the  "Generation Now" movement.

Early life

Eugene Cussons was born in the Transvaal province of South Africa. For generations, the Cussons family has been deeply rooted in the African conservation ethic, and Eugene grew up with a special appreciation for African wildlife. He studied business management and economics at the University of Pretoria.

Cussons had a successful career in the corporate world developing software for financial trading applications before building Chimp Eden. Deciding he did not want to be desk bound for the rest of his career, Cussons returned to the family game reserve to combine his management skills with his love for the outdoors.

Chimp Eden

Cussons opened Chimp Eden in 2006 in collaboration with the Jane Goodall Institute (JGI) in South Africa, as the Managing Director of Chimp Eden and the Rescue Director of JGI South Africa. Cussons has focused Chimp Eden's efforts on rescuing chimpanzees from areas no one else is willing to venture, such as war-torn countries like Sudan and Angola. Personally rescuing the chimpanzees, Cussons brings them back to Chimp Eden, where he is caretaker.

In a January 1, 2013, press release, Cussons announced he was resigning as Manager Director of Chimpanzee Eden and that all the responsibilities will be transferred to the JGI South Africa. The Cussons family will continue to provide the essential support services to the sanctuary and the Umhloti Nature Reserve would remain under the guardianship of the Cussons family.

Cussons announced he is looking forward to his new role as Executive Director and ambassador of the "Generation Now" movement.

Saving Chimpanzees

In July 2011, Cussons published his book Saving Chimpanzees. In the book, Cussons describes some of the ventures he had saving chimpanzees. In January 2013, the second edition of the book was released with an extra chapter where he describes the terrifying incident at Chimp Eden in June 2012, an attack of two chimps on a researcher. Cussons provides insight and describes the events, reasons and consequences of the attack on the student.

Generation Now

Cussons is the Executive Director and ambassador of the "Generation Now" movement. Generation Now is a global movement representing change in mindset towards conservation, education and humanitarianism.

Personal life

Eugene Cussons and his wife, Natasha, have a daughter named Haley. The family calls Chimp Eden home and their house is located on the family game reserve. Cussons is also a certified pilot, boat skipper, skydiver and rock climber. He's an expert off-road driver and held the position of head instructor for the Land Rover Experience in South Africa. Cussons has appeared on The Ellen DeGeneres Show, The Jay Leno Show and Martha Stewart Living to promote his show Escape To Chimp Eden.

References

Primatologists
University of Pretoria alumni
Living people
1979 births